María Florencia Cianfagna (born 30 January 1974), known as Florencia Cianfagna, is an Argentine former professional tennis player.

Cianfagna played on the professional tour in the 1990s, reaching best rankings of 365 in singles and 162 in doubles. She won six ITF doubles titles, which included a $25k tournament in Florianópolis in 1996. Her only WTA Tour main-draw appearance came at the 1997 Madrid Open, where she featured in the women's doubles.

ITF Circuit finals

Singles: 1 (runner-up)

Doubles: 10 (6 titles, 4 runner-ups)

References

External links
 
 

1974 births
Living people
Argentine female tennis players